Lalrinzuala Khiangte (born 9 November 1994) is an Indian professional footballer who plays as a midfielder for Mohun Bagan in the I-League.

Career
Born in Mizoram, Khiangte is a product of the academy at Shillong Lajong. He made his professional debut for the I-League club on 22 September 2016 in the Federation Cup against Dempo. Despite losing 1–0, Shillong Lajong head coach, Des Bulpin, praised Khiangte for his performance stating: "He was excellent and deserved to play along with his seniors today". He made his I-League debut for the club soon after, on 17 November 2012, against Mumbai. He started the match in the absence of Ebi Sukore and Minchol Son as Shillong Lajong lost 4–1.

After being released by Shillong Lajong, Khiangte returned to Mizoram. He was selected to be part of the Mizoram football team that participated in the Santosh Trophy. He soon also signed with Zo United of the Mizoram Premier League.

In 2016, Khiangte was playing for Aizawl in the Mizoram Premier League.

In 2018, Khiangte is playing for Mohun Bagan in the I-League.

Professional statistics

References

External links 
 Aizawl Football Club Profile.

1994 births
Living people
People from Mizoram
Indian footballers
Shillong Lajong FC players
Mizoram footballers
Aizawl FC players
Association football midfielders
Footballers from Mizoram
I-League players
Mizoram Premier League players